Guddu is a town in Sindh, Pakistan located about 10 km from Kashmore in the district of Kashmore, 650 km north of Karachi.

Vast reservoirs of natural gas were discovered at Sui, Balochistan in 1953 to pave the way for the development of a gigantic power system at Guddu, Sindh.

Discovery of Natural Gas and construction of barrage across Indus River has transformed Guddu, Sindh, Pakistan into a modern town. The gas from Sui Gas Field has made it possible to develop Pakistan's one of the largest thermal generation complex Guddu Thermal Station. Plants for the construction of first phase of Guddu Power Project took off in 1969. The Guddu Thermal Power Station can generate 2400+
Megawatts but it's only generating less than half of its production limit

Town Committee:—

Chairman: Mehrab Ali Mazari

Vice-Chairman :Meer Hamza Mazari

Secretary: Mohammad Qasim Dashti

It has got 10 wards and 300+ employees

The repercussions of 1972 Bhutto visit to Soviet Union were vast; including the ₨. 4.5 billion worth Steel Mills in Karachi; the thermal power plant in Guddu; and Pakistan's official departure from SEATO and CENTO.

See Also
 Guddu Thermal Station
 Guddu Barrage

Notes

External links
 Guddu, Pakistan

Populated places in Kashmore District